Ligularia dentata, the summer ragwort or leopardplant, is a species of flowering plant in the genus Ligularia and the family Asteraceae, native to China and Japan.

Description
The dark green leaves are large, long-stalked, leathery, cordate-based, and very rounded, with serrated edges (hence the Latin dentata meaning "toothed")
. Orange-yellow daisy-like composite flowers bloom on thick red, mostly leafless stalks, rising above the foliage in early summer.

Cultivation 
Ligularia dentata is grown as an ornamental plant, chosen as much for its bold foliage as its flowers. It is used as a round-leaved accent plant or massed planting in moist sun and partial shade garden settings, and in containers. Cultivars include 'Desdemona' and 'Othello'. Selections with cream colour spotted foliage (polka dots) are also grown.

See also
Farfugium japonicum

References

External links

Missouri Botanical Garden - Horticulture treatment: Ligularia dentata (Leopard plant)

dentata
Flora of China
Flora of Japan
Garden plants of Asia
Perennial plants
Plants described in 1939